An election for the Alnwick District Council was held on 4 May 1995.  The Liberal Democrats won the most seats, although the council stayed under no overall control. The whole council was up for election, and turnout was 47.1%.

Election result

See also 
Alnwick District Council elections

References 

District council elections in England
Council elections in Northumberland
Alnwick District Council elections